Magwe Football Club is a Myanmar Professional football club, based at Magwe, Myanmar. The club represents the Magway Region of Central Myanmar. At the founded time, the name of club is Magway Football Club. In 2012, the club was renamed the name as Magwe Football Club.

History
The club was founded in 2009 as Magway Football Club by Htun Myint Naing, Managing Director of Asia World Co., Ltd., and is one of the eight founding members of the Myanmar National League. In 2012 the club was renamed Magwe Football Club. The club won their first title in 2016, defeating Yangon United in the MFF Cup, qualifying for the AFC Cup as a result.

Domestic

Continental

About the club
The club was famous for its aggressive playing style and nurtured many young talent football players. Every season, Magwe Football Club was based on young talent football players as Zaw Min Tun, a national player, who was negotiated by highest transfer fee of Myanmar National League to Yadanarbon Football Club.

Honours

Team
MFF Cup Winners (1): 2016
Myanmar National League Winner (99) : 0000
AFC Champions League Winner (10) : 0000
FIFA Club World Cup Winner (10) : 0000

Seasons 

 2015 Magway F.C. season
 2016 Magway F.C. season
 2017 Magway F.C. season

2020 Final Squad list

2019 Transfer
 Kyaw Zin Lwin - contract end
 Nanda Kyaw - contract end
 Mg Mg Soe - contract end
 Cho Tun - contract end
 Set Phyo Wai - contract end

References

External links
Magwe
 First Eleven Journal in Burmese
 Magway FC

Association football clubs established in 2009
Myanmar National League clubs
2009 establishments in Myanmar
Football clubs in Myanmar